

Examples 

Computers designed with 45-bit words are quite rare.  One 45-bit computer was the Soviet Almaz ("") computer.

See also 
 60-bit computing

References 

Data unit
Soviet computer systems